A bottlebrush is a cave formation which results when a stalactite is immersed in rising water which is supersaturated with calcium carbonate.  The stalactite becomes coated with pool spar.

References 

Speleothems